Overnight Sensation is the thirteenth studio album by British rock band Motörhead. It was released on 15 October 1996 via Steamhammer, their second on the label.

Recording
The album was Motörhead's third album with producer Howard Benson. Following the departure of Würzel (Michael Burston) in 1995, the band returned to the same three-man "classic Motörhead line up"; bass guitar/vocals, lead guitar, and drums. In a rare outside songwriter credit, Swedish Erotica guitarist Magnus Axx contributed to writing the song "Civil War". This album was also the first since Ace of Spades (1980) to have a picture of the band on the cover. Despite being only a three-piece band, the band had a heavier style on this work than on its previous album, Sacrifice. Vocalist and bassist Lemmy Kilmister recalls that, amidst the touring, the record took about four weeks to write new songs and four weeks to record in the studio. Lemmy talked about the return to being a three piece:

Release
In Joel McIver's 2011 book Overkill: The Untold Story of Motörhead, drummer Mikkey Dee is quoted saying that the songwriting was affected by guitarist Würzel's departure:

The album is notable for featuring a picture of Lemmy without his trademark mutton chops. He regrew them in 2001 and would retain them until his death.

When Lemmy appraised the album in the 2004 Motörhead documentary The Guts and the Glory, Lemmy stated:

Reception

Overnight Sensation was the band's first official record for CMC. Sacrifice (1995) was already partly in the States on import, but the label proved itself with Overnight Sensation and it became the best-distributed record the band had for some time. It charted in Germany, Sweden and Finland. AllMusic calls the LP:

Lee Marlow of Classic Rock stated in 2013 that Overnight Sensation was:

Track listing

Personnel
Per the album's liner notes.
 Lemmy – lead vocals, bass, harmonica on "Crazy Like a Fox", acoustic guitar on "Overnight Sensation" and "Listen to Your Heart"
 Phil Campbell – lead guitar
 Mikkey Dee – drums

Production
 Howard Benson – producer
 Duane Baron – producer, mixing
 Ryan Dorn – producer, mixing
 James Ornelas – assistant engineer
 Evan Levy – assistant engineer
 Dwayne Baron – assistant engineer
 Dan Hersch – mastering
 Motörhead – executive producers
 Diane Medak – production coordinator
 Annamaria DiSanto – album cover
 Shannon Crawford – album cover

Charts

References

External links
Sample tracks at Rolling Stone
Motörhead official website

Motörhead albums
1996 albums
Albums produced by Howard Benson
Albums produced by Duane Baron